Sheikh Rajeh is a village in Bisheh Sar Rural District, in the Central District of Qaem Shahr County, Mazandaran Province, Iran. At the 2006 census, the population of Sheikh Rajeh was 179, in 50 families.
شیخرجه دارای یک چشمه بسیار زیبا و بزرگ با محیطی دلچسب بود که متاسفانه با همت شورا و دهیاران عزیز تخریب شد.

References 

Populated places in Qaem Shahr County